Pseudobatos prahli, also known by its common name Gorgona guitarfish is a species from the genus Pseudobatos.

References

prahli
Fish described in 1995